Clarence Joseph "Clare" Drouillard (March 2, 1914 — May 3, 1986) was a Canadian ice hockey player who played 10 games in the National Hockey League with the Detroit Red Wings during the 1937–38 season. The rest of his career, which lasted from 1933 to 1945, was spent in various minor leagues.

Career statistics

Regular season and playoffs

External links
 

1914 births
1986 deaths
Buffalo Bisons (AHL) players
Canadian expatriate ice hockey players in the United States
Canadian ice hockey centres
Detroit Red Wings players
Hershey Bears players
Ice hockey people from Ontario
Philadelphia Rockets players
Pittsburgh Hornets players
Providence Reds players
Sportspeople from Windsor, Ontario
Springfield Indians players
Toronto St. Michael's Majors players
Windsor Bulldogs (1929–1936) players